Kluczbork Town Hall - a Renaissance-Baroque building built in the eighteenth-century. The building was renovated and reconstructed in the subsequent centuries, last time in 1926. The building is the seat of a number of institutions including the Kluczbork City Council and a library. The building was renovated in the years of 2011–2012, during which the access roads to the town hall were also rebuilt.

Gallery

References

Kluczbork County
City and town halls in Poland